This is a list of Live with Regis and Kelly episodes which were broadcast during the show's 21st season.  The list is ordered by air date.

Although the co-hosts may have read a couple of emails during the broadcast, it does not necessarily count as a "Regis and Kelly Inbox" segment.

September 2008

October 2008

November 2008

December 2008

January 2009

February 2009

March 2009

April 2009

May 2009

June 2009

July 2009

August 2009

See also
 Live with Regis and Kelly (season 18)
 Live with Regis and Kelly (season 19)
 Live with Regis and Kelly (season 20)
 Live with Regis and Kelly (season 22)

References

2008 American television seasons
2009 American television seasons